The karmic process in Jainism is based on seven truths or fundamental principles (tattva) of Jainism which explain the human predicament. Out of those, four—influx (āsrava), bondage (bandha), stoppage (saṃvara)  and release (nirjarā)—pertain to the karmic process. Karma gets bound to the soul on account of two processes:
āsrava – Influx of karmas, and
bandha – bondage or  sticking of karmas to consciousness

Influx of Karma

The āsrava, that is, the influx of karma occurs when the karmic particles are attracted to the soul on account of vibrations created by activities of mind, speech and body. Tattvārthasūtra, 6:1–2 states: "The activities of body, speech and mind is called yoga. This three-fold action results in āsrava or influx of karma." The karmic inflow on account of yoga driven by passions and emotions cause a long term inflow of karma prolonging the cycle of reincarnations. On the other hand, the karmic inflows on account of actions that are not driven by passions and emotions have only a transient, short-lived karmic effect.

Causes of influx
The karmas are attracted to the consciousness by combination of the following factors pertaining to action—instrumentality, process, modality and motivation Thus, the karmas are attracted and bound on account of combination any element of the following four factors:
the instrumentality of the actions, that is, either through:
body – physical action,
speech – verbal action, or
mind – mental action
the process of action which consists of:
decision or plan to act,
making preparations for the act, like, collecting necessary materials, or
actually beginning of the action
the modality of action, that consists of:
the act carried out by self, or
instigating someone else to carry out the act, or
giving approval or endorsing the act.
the motivation for action. This includes any of the following negative emotions that motivates the action:
Anger
Greed
Pride
Manipulation or deceit

With a combination of any of the elements of the above four factors, there are 108 ways with which the karmas can be attracted to the soul. Even a silent assent or endorsements of acts of violence done by someone else far away, have karmic consequences for the soul. Hence, the scriptures advice carefulness in actions, awareness of the world, and purity in thoughts as a means to avoid the karmas.

Bondage of karmas

The karmas have effect only when they are bound to the consciousness. This binding of the karma to the consciousness is called bandha. However, the yoga or the activities alone do not produce bondage. Out of the many causes of bondage, passion is considered as the main cause of bondage. The karmas are literally bound on account of the stickiness of the soul due to existence of various passions or mental dispositions. The passions like anger, pride, deceit and greed are called sticky (kasayas) because they act like glue in making karmic particles stick to the soul resulting in bandha. Hence the ancient Jain texts talk of subduing these negative emotions:
When he wishes that which is good for him, he should get rid of the four fault—anger, pride, deceit and greed—which increase the evil. Anger and pride when not suppressed, and deceit and greed when arising: all these four black passions water the roots of re-birth.

—Daśavaikālika sūtra, 8:36–39

Causes of bondage

According to Tattvārthasūtra, the causes of karmic bondage—in the order they are required to be eliminated by a soul for spiritual progress—are:
 Mithyātva (Irrationality and a deluded world view) – The deluded world view is the misunderstanding as to how this world really functions on account of one-sided perspectives, perverse viewpoints, irrational scepticism, pointless generalisations and ignorance.
 Avirati (non-restraint or a vowless life) – The second cause of bondage, avirati is the inability to refrain voluntarily from the evil actions, that harms oneself and others. The state of  avirati can only be overcome by observing the minor vows of a layman.
 Pramāda (carelessness and laxity of conduct) – This third cause of bondage consists of absentmindedness, lack of enthusiasm towards acquiring merit and spiritual growth, and improper actions of mind, body and speech without any regard to oneself or others.
  (passions or negative emotions) –  The four passions—anger, pride, deceit and greed—are the primary reason for the attachment of the karmas to the soul. They keep the soul immersed in the darkness of delusion leading to deluded conduct and unending cycles of reincarnations.
 Yoga (activities of mind, speech and body) – The threefold activities of mind, body and speech attract and bind the karmas when such actions are influenced by passions.

Each cause presupposes the existence of the next cause, but the next cause does not necessarily pre-suppose the existence of the previous cause. A soul is able to advances on the spiritual ladder called , only when it is able to eliminate the above causes of bondage one by one. Duration and intensity of the karmic bond are determined by "" and type and quantity of the karmas bound depends on yoga.

Causes of different types of karmas
Chapter VI of Tattvārthasūtra provides a detailed description of various causes for various types of karmas. According to Jain texts, there are eight main types of karma—jñānavāraṇa (Knowledge obscuring karma), darśanāvaraṇa (perception obscuring karma) mohanīya (deluding karma), antarāya (obstacles creating karma), vedanīya (feeling producing karma), nāma (body determining karma), āyu (life span determining karma) and "gotra" (status determining karma).

Causes of knowledge obscuring and perception obscuring karmas
Jñānavāraṇa  and darśanāvaraṇa  karma are knowledge obscuring and perception obscuring. They are caused by:
harbouring a feeling of jealousy towards knowledge or perception, towards a possessor of it and towards a means of it.
 Wilful concealment of knowledge or perception
Ungenerosity as to knowledge
Obstruction of knowledge or perception to others
Denial of receipt of knowledge
 False accusation or misrepresentation

Causes of feeling producing karma

Vedanīya, feeling producing karmas can be of two types: sātāvedanīya i.e. pleasant and asātāvedanīya i.e. unpleasant feeling producing karmas.

Causes of asātāvedanīya karma
Asātāvedanīya karma is bound on account of causing to other or oneself the following:
External or an internal pain
To feel troubled and worried on having been deprived of the company of a well-wisher
Experience of acute distress or heart burning on account of insult or insulting others
To enjoy or wallow in misery, to weep and wail
Injuring self or others
Lamenting on recalling the merits of a departed one

Causes of sātāvedanīya karma
Sātāvedanīya karma is bound on account of causing to other or oneself the following:
Harbouring a feeling of compassion towards all the living
Leading a religious life i.e. practice of minor vows or anuvrata by householder and mahavrata by monks and ascetics
Donation and charity with humility
Self restraint or proper attentiveness towards disciplined life even if it is tinged with some attachment
Forbearance and forgiveness
Inculcating purity by suppressing the tendency towards greed and the like defilements

Causes of deluding karmas
Mohanīya  karmas produce a delusion in a soul i.e. the soul is not able to distinguish between right and wrong. They are of two subtypes—Darśana-mohanīya (Perception delusion) and cāritra-mohanīya (conduct deluding) karmas.

Causes of Darśana-mohanīya
Speaking ill of the omniscient and holders of true knowledge
Speaking ill of the scripture i.e. a jealous intellect leveling false charges against the scripture  (e.g.  Saying that this scripture is useless because it is composed in Prakrit which is a language of the illiterate   alternatively, because it is composed in a complication ridden language of the pedant   or that it contains a futile and bothersome description of the various vows, regulations, expiations etc.)
Speaking ill of the religious order or levelling false charges against the religious order composed of four divisions   viz.  monks, nuns, laymen, laywomen  (e.g.  saying that these monks unnecessarily take the trouble of observing vows, regulations etc., since monkhood is in fact an impossibility nor is it conducive to a wholesome result, or saying about the laymen that they undertake no cultured performances like bath, donation etc., nor do they lead a life of purity.)
Speaking ill of the religion
Speaking ill of the deities or denigrating them

Causes of Cāritra-mohanīya karmas
To produce a kasaya (passions) in oneself or in others and to undertake unworthwhile acts under the influence of a kasaya
To ridicule the true religion, to make fun of a poor or helpless person, to develop the habit of frivolous joking
Indulging in various recreations evincing disinclination towards the proper moral restrains like vows and regulations
To cause worry to others, to disturb someone in one's rest and to keep the company of petty persons
To maintain a sorrowful demeanour and to arouse a feeling of sorrow in others
To feel afraid and to frighten others
To despise a beneficial act and a beneficial general conduct
A habit for cheating and finding fault with others
To nourish mental impressions of various sexual feelings

The causes of lifespan determining karmas
The āyu karmas are the life span determining karmas and they determine the next destiny or reincarnation of a soul. Accordingly, as per the next reincarnations lifespan determined, a soul takes birth in either hell, heaven, animal kingdom or as a human (this list is not exhaustive).

Causes of the Narakayus karma or birth in hells

Following reasons result in birth in naraka or hells:
Killing or causing pain with intense passion
 Excessive attachment to things and worldly pleasure with constantly indulging in cruel and violent acts.
Vowless and unrestrained life

Causes of the Tiryagayus karma or birth as animals
Following actions conducted with deceit  lead to births animals, plants or microbes:
Preaching religion to introduce sheer falsity
Propagate religion with a selfish motive
Vowless and unrestrained life

Causes of Manusyayus karma or birth as human
To reduce the tendency to inflict injury and that to accumulate possession.
To exhibit softness and simplicity.
Vowless and unrestrained life
Helping the needy (poor, friends, old peoples, blind and handicaps etc.)
Doing charity
Forgiveness
To respect humans

Causes of the Devayus karma or birth in Heavens

Having a disciplined and restrained life yet accompanied by some attachment
Partial practice of vows like non-violence, etc.
Refraining from evil acts but out of compulsion from external factors or for imitating others
Undergoing childish penances like fasting and austerities without understanding
Practicing vows and austerities normally leads to destruction of karmas and of attainment of moksa or liberation, but in above cases leads to merit and birth in heavens as demi-gods for a long but finite period of time.

Causes of body determining karma
The nāma karmas or body determining karmas are of two types—asubha and subha nama karmas i.e. auspicious and inauspicious karmas. Their causes are:
 Crooked and misleading actions (pertaining to mind, speech and body) causes inflow of inauspicious nāma karma
 The opposite of the above—straightforwardness and genuine behaviour—causes inflow of auspicious nāma karma.
 Sixteen dispositions that cause rebirth as a Tīrthaṅkara on account of Tīrthaṅkara–nāma-karma:
 purity of worldview,
 humility,
 non-violation of vows and abstinences, 
 persistent cultivation of knowledge, 
 ever present fear of worldly existence, 
 charity and renunciation as per one's capacity, 
 penance as per one's capacity, 
 ensuring harmony and peace in the religious order particularly the order of monks, 
 offering services to the competent and deserving persons, 
 devotion towards Siddhas and Tīrthaṅkaras, 
 devotion towards the preceptor, 
 devotion towards  learned monks, 
 devotion towards scriptures, 
 regard for compulsory duties, 
 to cultivate and honour the path of mokṣa,  
 feeling of unattached affection towards the co-religionists.

Causes of Status determining
The gotra karma or status determining karma is of two types:
Nicagotra karma: Praising oneself, defaming others, hiding others’ merits and finding fault in others are the causes of low status or low class.
Uccagotra karma: Praising others, displaying one’s own shortcomings, ignoring one’s own merit along with humility and modesty cause the inflow of high status determining karma.

Causes of Obstructing karma
The causes of inflow of obstructing or antarāya karma are—causing  obstruction to others or  intending to place or placing obstacles before others in their attempts towards beneficence, gain, satisfaction, comfort and power.

See also
Types of Karma
Gunasthana

References

Karma in Jainism